Mike Gonzales  is a former United States decathlete.

Gonzales attended Bishop Montgomery High School in Redondo Beach, California, where he played both football and track and field. He was inducted into the school's Athletic Hall of Fame in 2013.

Gonzales was offered multiple football scholarships to play at top universities. He accepted a full scholarship in Track and Field from University of Southern California with the intention of becoming an Olympic athlete. At USC Gonzales was a standout in decathlon, where he held the USC Decathlon School record from 1984-2019. He competed and won the gold medal in decathlon at the 1987 Pan American Games in Indiana.

Gonzales tried four times to make the USA Olympic Team in Decathlon (1984 1988, 1992,1996) but was plagued by injury in each attempt. Gonzales was recruited by Olympian Liston Bochette to participate in the 1998 Winter Olympics representing Puerto Rico in the four-man bobsled team.

Gonzales later became a competitive amateur golfer, competing in over 400 tournaments. In 2016 Mike Gonzales began to complete as a professional golfer, completing in Champion Tour Event qualifiers and 3 of the Champion Tour Qualifying School Tournaments. Today he is the CEO for TOPIMR, a web-based Internet Marketing Company.

Honors and awards
 2014 USC Track and Field Hall of Fame; Heritage Award recipient 
 2013 Bishop Montgomery High School, Athletic Hall of Fame
 1988 Personal Record Decathlon 8,203 points
 1987 Gold Medalist, Pan American Games Decathlon
 1987 United States Olympics Festival Decathlon Gold Medalist
 1984 USC All-American, Decathlon
 1984 USC Track and Field Record, Decathlon (8,022), Held Record 1984-2019
 1983,1984, 1985 3 Time All-Pac-10 Decathlon
 1980 United States Junior Olympics National Decathlon
 1980 United States National Age Group Decathlon Record 16 years and under

Education 
 Bishop Montgomery High School, Torrance CA (1982)
 University of Southern California, BS in Communications(full scholarship, track and field)

Personal life 

Gonzales resides in Southern California with his wife, Debra and his son Tanner.

References 

1964 births
Living people
Athletes (track and field) at the 1987 Pan American Games
Pan American Games gold medalists for the United States
American male decathletes
USC Trojans men's track and field athletes
Sportspeople from Redondo Beach, California
Track and field athletes from California
Pan American Games medalists in athletics (track and field)
Medalists at the 1987 Pan American Games